Hargate may refer to the following places in England:

Fleet Hargate, village in Lincolnshire
Hargate Wall, hamlet in Derbyshire